The 2008 Division 1 season was the 43rd of the competition of the first-tier football in Senegal.  The tournament was organized by the Senegalese Football Federation.  The season began in late in the mid year on 26 June and finished late on 23 November.  It was the first year they played at a professional level, also it was the final season it was titled "Division", the following year would become a "League" ("Ligue" in French).  AS Douanes won their fifth title, the next club to win three consecutive titles.  AS Douanes along with Casa Sport would compete in the 2009 CAF Champions League the following season.  ASC Diaraf who won the 2008 Senegalese Cup participated in the 2009 CAF Confederation Cup, along with ASC Yakaar after defeating ASC HLM in a Confederation Cup qualification barrage.

The season would feature 20 clubs, two additional clubs from Division 2 added to the total. 178 matches and the playoff system would be restored with only a single final match totaling 179 and 180 with a Confederation Cup qualification match.  This was the only season that was done, the number of clubs would be reduced to 18 in the following season along with the total match numbers to 173. The season scored a total of 283 goals, 151 in Group A and 130 in Group B for a total of 280 and three in the finals.  Two goals were scored in the qualification barrage.

ASC Linguère and CNEPS Excellence were promoted from Division 2.  At the end of the season, Xam Xam and Renaissance de Dakar were relegated into Ligue 2.

AS Douanes again was the defending team of the title.

Participating clubs

 ASC Renaissance de Dakar
 ASC Linguère
 ASC Port Autonome
 AS Douanes
 ASC Jeanne d'Arc
 ASC Saloum
 US Gorée
 Casa Sport
 ASC Yakaar
 ASC Xam Xam

 ASC HLM
 ASC Diaraf
 ASC Thiès
 CNEPS Excellence
 Dakar Université Club
 ASC SUNEOR
 ASEC Ndiambour
 Stade de Mbour
 US Ouakam
 Guédiawaye FC

Overview
The league was contested by 20 teams and two groups, each group contained ten clubs and a final match.

League standings

Group A

Group B

Final phase

Confederation Cup qualification barrage

References

Senegal
Senegal Premier League seasons